Polypodium pellucidum (ʻAe) is a species of fern which grows on lava flows in Hawaii.

Description
It is one of the first plants to colonize a new lava flow and is often found growing in small cracks.

Range
It is found only in the Hawaiian islands.

Taxonomy
Polypodium pellucidum contains the following varieties:
 Polypodium pellucidum var. acuminatum
 Polypodium pellucidum var. pellucidum

References

Native ferns of Hawaii
pellucidum